Jakub Paul (born 22 March 1999) is a Swiss tennis player. He has a career high ATP singles ranking of World No. 438 achieved on 21 February 2022. He also has a career high ATP doubles ranking of World No. 219 achieved on 31 October 2022.

Career

2018-2022: ATP debut
Paul made his ATP main draw debut as a wildcard at the 2018 Swiss Open Gstaad in the doubles draw partnering Adrian Bodmer, together defeating fellow Swiss wildcards Marc-Andrea Hüsler and Luca Margaroli.

He entered the 2021 Swiss Open Gstaad also as a wildcard in the doubles draw partnering with Leandro Riedi. They won their maiden doubles match as a team against Evan King and Max Schnur.

He also entered the 2022 Geneva Open as a wildcard with Riedi where they reached the quarterfinals defeating second seeds Jamie Murray and Bruno Soares.

ATP Challenger and ITF Futures/World Tennis Tour finals

Singles: 6 (3-3)

Doubles: 21 (13–8)

External links

1999 births
Living people
Swiss male tennis players
People from Chur
Sportspeople from Graubünden